Kincheloe is an unincorporated community in Harrison County, in the U.S. state of West Virginia.

History
A post office called Kincheloe was established in 1855, and remained in operation until 1969. The community was named after nearby Kincheloe Creek.

References

Unincorporated communities in Harrison County, West Virginia
Unincorporated communities in West Virginia